John Alexander Third (1865–1948) was a Scottish mathematician.

Life and work 
Third, son of a stonemason, was educated at Robert Gordon's College before entering in 1885 in the University of Aberdeen where he graduated D.Sc in 1889, after spending some time studying in Jena, Germany. He was appointed rector of Campbeltown Grammar School and, five years later, in 1895, headmaster of Spier's School.

Third joined the Edinburgh Mathematical Society in 1897 and he was an enthusiastic member publishing papers in the Proceedings. He was also president of the society in 1902. He was director of education of Ayrshire from 1919 until his retirement in 1927.

After his death, his family made a bequest of £150  to found a prize in the Department of Mathematics of the university of Aberdeen.

References

Bibliography

External links 
 

1865 births
1948 deaths
19th-century Scottish mathematicians
20th-century Scottish mathematicians
People educated at Robert Gordon's College
Alumni of the University of Aberdeen
Scottish schoolteachers